is a railway station on the Amagi Line located in Ogōri, Fukuoka Prefecture, Japan. It is operated by the Amagi Railway, a third sector public-private partnership corporation.

Lines
All Amagi Line trains stop at the station.

Layout
The station consists of a side platform serving a single elevated track. There is no station building but the platform has a shelter for waiting passengers. Access to the platform is by means of a flight of steps. A toilet building has been built under the elevated structure. Another flight of steps near the station entrance provides access to the connecting bus stop for the Nishitetsu Express Bus. This stop is located on the Oita Expressway which is at the same level as the elevated railway track.

Platforms

Adjacent stations

History
Amagi Railway opened the station on 1 November 1987 as an added station on the existing Amagi Line track.

Surrounding area 
 Ogōri City Culture Center
 Ogōri City Library
 Ogōri City Gymnasium
 Ogōri City Police Station
 Ogōri Post Office
 Ogōri City Hall
 Aeon Ogōri Shopping Center
 Oita Expressway
 Japan National Route 500

References

Railway stations in Fukuoka Prefecture
Railway stations in Japan opened in 1987